is an island in the Pacific Ocean, southwest of the Oshika Peninsula and in Miyagi Prefecture, Japan.

History
Tools have been excavated on the island that would suggest there has been human settlement for at least 2000 years. Aji Island is one of the first locations that marked a regular relationship between Japan and Russian when the local citizens traded with a Russian expedition.

March 2011 earthquake
The epicenter of the major Tōhoku earthquake and tsunami that struck Japan on 11 March 2011 was located off the coast of Aji Island and Miyagi Prefecture. The Tōhoku region, including Aji island, suffered serious damage and further reduced the number of residents on an island already suffering from depopulation. The locals are now trying to rebuild the island and increase population levels.

Agriculture is the main focus of the island's rejuvenation. Locals encourage agriculture and many of them have worked the fields themselves. The goal is for local farmers to make a living with their agriculture.

Principal products
Produce grown on the island includes sweet potatoes. With an aging population doing the farming, it is difficult to find young people who want to take up the profession. The Tōhoku earthquake and tsunami was devastating to the island's economy. An organization called "ABE" was formed, with the "A" standing for agriculture and the "BE" standing for benefit. It is also a play on words and means "Let's Go". A representative of ABE, Abe Takahiro, has said that it is through agriculture that the island will be revitalized and the goal of the organization is self-sufficiency through agriculture.

A variety of fish and seafood are harvested in the waters around the island, including salmon and sea urchin. On July 4, 2014, the sale of Ginzake salmon caught in local waters was reallowed. It was first allowed in 2007 and proved to be popular and profitable. After the 2011 earthquake, it was stopped.

Medical care
There is only one hospital on Aji Island: Amishoiin. It is a former primary school that was convented for medical care.
Caring for a rapidly aging population requires consistent medical care and running the hospital is a challenge, despite the need.

References

Islands of Miyagi Prefecture